The Marketplace Mall is a shopping center managed by Wilmorite and located on Hylan Drive in Henrietta, New York, a suburb of Rochester.

The space at the southeast corner of West Henrietta Road (NY 15) and Jefferson Road (NY 252) was previously Hylan Airport, a general aviation facility home to Ray Hylan's school of aviation. In the 1970s, Hylan moved his school to the Rochester – Monroe County Airport and worked with the Wilmot family to develop the former airfield into commercial space.

The Marketplace Mall opened on October 7, 1982 as the largest mall and the first regional mall located between New York City and Cleveland.  On opening day, The Marketplace was anchored by Sibley's, McCurdy's, B. Forman Co. and Sears. It was home to 140 specialty retailers.  In February 1983, JCPenney added on as the fifth department store. Since 1982 four out parcels have been added to the property. In 1990, Sibley's became Kaufmann's. In 1994, McCurdy's became The Bon-Ton. In 2001, an  Galyan's was added on to the south side of the mall, which was converted to a Dick's Sporting Goods in 2004. In September 2006, Kaufmann's became Macy's.

In 1982, The Marketplace was the fifth shopping center to open in the Rochester, NY Market behind Midtown Plaza in 1962, Greece Towne Mall in 1967, Long Ridge Mall in 1971, and Eastview Mall in 1971. It was the second major retail shopping center to open in Henrietta following Southtown Plaza. The area surrounding the mall, which was previously vacant farmland, has been developed both commercially and residentially over the past twenty years. There are five parcels totaling  available for future development located adjacent to the Marketplace Commons. Marketplace Commons was developed by Wilmorite and is located next to the Marketplace Mall.

On March 19, 2017, Macy's, which maintains several much larger outposts around Western New York, announced as part of a strategy to focus on their highest achieving locations that they would be leaving the center with IKEA reportedly named as interested in their space. IKEA for the near future has delayed future store openings as they focus on other territories. The store is being reconstructed for big box retailer Floor & Decor which will be completed by 2023.

On March 17, 2019, it was announced that Sears would shutter and be replaced by a $240 million development for UR Medicine that would be completed by 2023.

On November 18, 2022, four new tenants were announced for the site: ZOKE, Pita Chik, Floor and Décor, and Juan & Maria's.

References

External links
Official website
Wilmorite website

Shopping malls in New York (state)
Shopping malls established in 1982